The Aero Club of America was a social club formed in 1905 by Charles Jasper Glidden and Augustus Post, among others, to promote aviation in America.  It was the parent organization of numerous state chapters, the first being the Aero Club of New England. It thrived until 1923, when it transformed into the National Aeronautic Association, which still exists today. It issued the first pilot's licenses in the United States, and successful completion of its licensing process was required by the United States Army for its pilots until 1914. It sponsored numerous air shows and contests. Cortlandt Field Bishop was president in 1910. Starting in 1911, new president Robert J. Collier began presenting the Collier Trophy.

History

Although conventional wisdom states that the Aero Club began in 1905, there are photos of high society and adventurers printed in 1902 with the stamp, "Aero Club".  In the summer of 1905 several members of the Automobile Club of America including Charles Glidden, Homer Hedge, Dave Morris, John F. O'Rourke, and Augustus Post founded the Aero Club of America. They were avid balloonists but found little support in America for the sport of aviation. They determined to establish a new club with an organization similar to the Automobile Club but whose purpose was to promote aviation, much like the Aero Club of France. Homer Hedge became the first President and Augustus Post the first secretary.

In 1910, three different conventions were held in New York among aeronautical clubs and societies. The National Council of Affiliated Clubs of the Aero Club of America, was formed. Thirty-nine delegates, representing constituencies from Pasadena, California, to Boston, met at the Aero Club and formed the parent organization of various state chapters.

At the Belmont Air Show in October 1910, a considerable controversy arose between the Englishman Claude Graham-White and the American J. B. Moisant. In one race around the Statue of Liberty, Graham-White won by several minutes, but due to a technicality, the race and considerable prize money was awarded to Moisant. John Armstrong Drexel made public statements accusing the organization of favoritism toward its own members, and Drexel held a competing dinner banquet at the same time as the awards banquet of the organization. The schism among the membership threatened the integrity of the organization, but was ultimately resolved with Drexel's resignation.

In 1911, the Aero Club of New York put on the First Industrial Airplane Show that was held in conjunction with the 11th U.S. International Auto Show at Manhattan's Grand Central Palace, in New York City.  It was a spectacular event with prominent speakers, and an enthusiastic large crowd that would gaze upon a full-size airplane for the first time. It started December 31, 1910, until mid-January 1911.

In 1919, the secretary of the club, Augustus Post organized and drew up the rules for a transatlantic flight competition between New York and Paris. He worked with wealthy hotel owner Raymond Orteig in securing the $25,000 for the Orteig Prize.  The $25,000 prize was to be awarded "to the first aviator of any Allied Country crossing the Atlantic in one flight, from Paris to New York or New York to Paris".  After five years of failing to attract competitors, the award was then put under the control of a seven-member Bryant Bank board of trustees, which awarded it to Charles Lindbergh for his successful 1927 flight in the Spirit of St. Louis.

Historical notes 

Some of the later licenses issued by the Aero Club of America bore the printed signature of Orville Wright. Wright served for a time as Chairman of the Aero Club of America's Contest Committee. Contrary to popular myth, the Wright brothers were not issued licenses number 4 and 5 for malicious reasons.  They were simply among the five pilots who had, in America, demonstrated their ability to fly airplanes before the Aero Club of America's licensing program began.  Those first five licenses were issued in alphabetical order — a practice followed by other national organizations belonging to the FAI.

Pilot's licenses were not required by law (except by some states) until well after World War I.  Aero Club of America licenses were required for participation in sporting events and demonstrations sanctioned by the ACA and FAI, and they gave credibility to pilots seeking to perform demonstration flights for hire, but many American pilots never applied for a license, which required a demonstration of flight proficiency. The ACA was also notorious for the inflexibility of its licensing process, which prescribed, among other items, a letter of application, a photograph of a candidate, appointment of an ACA examiner, and his report of examination, all of which had to be submitted in the correct form and sequence for a license to be issued, whether the candidate passed the flight test or not.

Notable licensees
Some notable early pilots issued licenses by the Aero Club of America are listed below.

Airplane division
01 Glenn Curtiss
02 Frank Purdy Lahm
03 Louis Paulhan, French aviator
04 Orville Wright (honorary)
05 Wilbur Wright (honorary)
06 Clifford B. Harmon
07 Thomas Scott Baldwin (1854–1923)
08 John Armstrong Drexel
09 Todd Shriver
10 Charles Foster Willard
11 James Cairn Mars (1875–1944)
13 Leon Richardson (1887-1951)
17 Eugene Ely
24 Charles Terres Weymann
25 Augustus Post
26 Ralph Clayton Diggins (1887–1959) of the Ralph C. Diggins Company. He was born on March 7, 1887, in Cadillac, Michigan and moved to Chicago, Illinois. He made his first flight in 1912 and was the 26th person in the United States to receive a pilot's license issued by the Aero Club of America. He died in 1959.
28 Theodore Gordon Ellyson
32 Edson Fessenden Gallaudet
35 William Redmond Cross, Governor, Aero Club of America, 1911-1921 
37 Harriet Quimby, first woman  
44 Matilde Moisant, second woman  
55 Norman Prince, early member of the Lafayette Escadrille
57 Paul Peck, one of the first US army pilots. As a first lieutenant in the US Army he was one of only three officers chosen by the War Department to learn to fly under Glenn H Curtiss. He was issued pilot license #57 by the Aero Club of America in July 1911. In August 1911 he was the first person ever to fly over the U.S. Capitol Building and circle the Washington Monument, thrilling crowds and covering 24 miles in 25 minutes, setting a speed record. When the first U.S. military aviation school opened at College Park, Maryland, in 1911, Peck was an instructor.  He was given the honorary title as “colonel” by a local governor. In May 1912 he set the American duration record when he remained in the air for 4 hours, 33 minutes and 15 seconds. Peck is among the first pilots ever hired for the experimental US Airmail service and he made regular deliveries from New York City to several Long Island towns.
On July 19, 1912, Lt. Peck landed on the racetrack at Coney Island, an amusement park in Cincinnati, Ohio, named after the famed park in New York. Progressive reformers had been closing race tracks around the country and the venues were sore need of revenue so the Coney Island racetrack was used as a runway. Peck carried a sack of mail filled with postcards sold at Coney Island and stamped “U.S. Official Aerial Mail”. 
133 Julia Clark, third woman  
148 Katherine Stinson (1891–1977) fourth woman.  She convinced flight instructor Max Lillie of Chicago to take her on as a student in 1912. Katherine became the fourth licensed female pilot in the U.S., she began touring as a stunt pilot and became one of the country's most famous female aviators.
173 Bernetta Adams Miller, fifth woman.  
188 Ruth Bancroft Law, aka Ruth Law Oliver, sixth woman.
303 Marjorie Stinson, (sister of Katherine) the ninth licensed female pilot in United States.   
354 Albert Daniel Smith (1887-1970).
440 Reginald Malcolm, World War I flying ace

 denotes a female aviator

Seaplane (Hydroaeroplane) division
01 Adolph G. Sutro
02 Lieutenant Alfred Austell Cunningham (USN)
03 Lieutenant B. B. Smith (USN)
04 Lieutenant Commander Patrick Nieson Lynch Bellinger (USN)
05 Ensign Godfrey DeCourcelles Chevalier (USN)
06 Logan Archbold Vilas
07 William Ellwood Doherty
08 H. P. Harris
09 Ernest C. Bass
10 Steve MacGordon
26 Roger Weightman Jannus (1886-1918)

Balloon division

See who's who of ballooning.

01 Major James C. McCoy (USA) 
02 Albert Leo Stevens
03 Frank Samuel Lahm
04 Colonel Frank Purdy Lahm (USA)
05 Carl E. Meyers
06 Colonel Henry B. Hersey (USA)
07 Allan R. Hawley
08 Colonel Charles deForest Chandler (USA)
09 Thomas Scott Baldwin (1854–1923)
10 Albert C. Triaca
11 Augustus Post
27 Sylvester Louis Von Phul (1878–1911)
533 Harry Rasmussen (1886–1968)

Airship (Dirigible) division
Note: "Dirigible" simply meant that the airship could be made to go in any direction.

01 Major Thomas Scott Baldwin (1854–1923)
02 Brigadier General Frank Purdy Lahm (1887-1963)
03 Captain Horace Bird Wild (1879-1940)
04 Augustus Roy Knabenshue (1875-1960)
05 Albert Leo Stevens (1877-1944)
06 Frank W. Goodale
07 Ralph Hazlett Upson (1888-1968)
08 Ralph Albion Drury Preston (?-1954) 
09 Walter J. Pouchot
10 Noel Chadwick

Presidents
Charles Jasper Glidden 1905 to 1910
Cortlandt Field Bishop 1910 to 1913
Alan Ramsay Hawley 1913 to ?
Jonathan Gaffney 2007 to present

See also
Other Aero clubs
National Aeronautic Association, the ACA's direct American successor (1922)
Aéro-Club de France (1898)
Royal Aero Club (1901)

Early Birds of Aviation

References 

America
Aviation history of the United States
Wright brothers